Mary Bethune may refer to:
 Mary Bethune Abbott (1823–1898), wife of John Abbott, Prime Minister of Canada
 Mary Beaton or Bethune (1543–1598), Scottish noblewoman and attendant of Mary, Queen of Scots
 Mary McLeod Bethune (1875–1955), African-American educator, philanthropist and civil rights activist